The Di Rudinì IV government of Italy held office from 14 December 1897 until 1 June 1898, a total of 169 days, or 5 months and 18 days.

Government parties
The government was composed by the following parties:

Composition

References

Italian governments
1897 establishments in Italy